Vivekananda Vidyapith Higher Secondary School is a Bengali medium school established in 1965 in the Central Colony area of the Railway Township of New Bongaigaon. This is a Bengali Medium School under SEBA. From class pre-school to X it offers education in Bangla and in the Higher Secondary Section from class XI to XII it offers courses in Assamese in the Arts stream only. The school has three administrative sections -
Class Nursery - Class V (LP)
Class V - VIII - (ME)
Class IX - XII - (Higher)
It has separate buildings for the three sections. Classes are held in a co-educational setup.

History 
The school came into being long back in 1965 at the efforts of a number of early initiators among whom the first principal of the school Shaktipada Chattopadhyay was the most prominent. The area was leased to the school for a period of 100 years.

Uniform 
The uniform of the school is Khaki Pant and White Shirts for boys and Green Skirt and White Shirt for girls till class 7. From class 8 girls have to wear green embroidered White Sarees.

Prayer
The school begins with the singing of the national song of India Vande Mataram.

Results 
This school is one of major schools in Bongaigaon. The results of Vivekananda Vidyapith has been consistently improving. There were bright former students including Siddhartha Sarkar who had secured 13th rank all over Assam in HSLC exam 2008.
Specially the school is known for its cultural activities.

Sports Day 
The school organizes a sports day annually where several athletic competitions are held among students.

School magazine 
Arghya (অর্ঘ্য) is the school magazine of Vivekananda Vidyapith Higher Secondary School. The magazine is published by own work of students and teachers.

References

Schools in Bongaigaon
1965 establishments in Assam
Educational institutions established in 1965